The Kyjov Hills is an area in the South Moravian Region of the Czech Republic.  

These relatively modest hills and undulating plateaus form a part of the Central Moravian Carpathians, within the Outer Western Carpathians.

Economically it's an agricultural area with a substantial share of vineyards and orchards.

References

Mountains and hills of the Czech Republic
Western Carpathians
Hodonín District
Uherské Hradiště District